The Sergeant Major of the Army is the most senior member of the other ranks of the Danish Army. The appointment holder has the rank of Chefsergeant. The post was created as part of the changes to the Danish Army in Autumn 2014, and is inspired by the American equivalent. The holder is appointed to serve as adviser for the Army Staff and as well as a representative for all army NCOs. The holder will further more be conveying his own and army leadership messages, and attitudes to army personal. In 2016, the Royal Danish Air Force created the Chief Master Sergeant of the Royal Danish Air Force. In 2018, the equivalent for the navy, Master Chief Petty Officer of the Royal Danish Navy, was created.

The first holder is Henning Bæk, who was appointed in October 2014. Bæk has expressed, that he will also be focusing on the uniform and grooming standards, and intendeds to stay at the post between four and six years.

Insignia

On 13 December 2016, a new insignia was introduced for the Sergeant Major of the Army, who had formerly used the standard Sergeant Major insignia. The new insignia had been created with the help of the Danish National Archives' Heraldry consultant.

List of Sergeant Major of the Army

Notes

References

Royal Danish Army
Military of Denmark
Military units and formations established in 2014